The STD Bus is a computer bus that was used primarily for industrial control systems, but has also found applications in computing. The STD Bus has also been designated as STD-80, referring to its relation to the Zilog Z80 series microprocessors. The term STD is in reference to "Standard", but several marketing terms were also promulgated, including Simple To Design, Simple To Debug, and Swift To Deliver.

Description
The STD Bus uses 6.5" by 4.5" expansion card with an edge connector with 56 pins. Many different types of cards have been available for the STD Bus, from processing cards, RAM cards, I/O cards, and specialized cards for various applications.

The use of the STD bus has declined. From the over one hundred manufacturers of components during its peak, vendor numbers have dwindled to under a dozen, but it is still used by hobbyists, manufacturers and in industrial applications.

Connector pin assignments
The STD Bus has a card edge connector with 56 contacts. The pin configuration is as follows. Flow is relative using a STD Bus Processor Card.

Applications
A focus of the STD bus was its ability to build a system using the exact bus cards required for an application.  The compact size of a card made the STD bus system more adaptable to various applications than the contemporary computer buses of the mid-1980s such as the S-100 and the SS-50, because it could use servo control cards along with a fully programmable computer for mathematical operations.

In applications for running an astronomical observatory, the large industrial base of cards, and the system's expandability, made the system desirable for use in a photometry lab to control the telescope as well as do the data logging and computations required.

In typical university laboratory settings of the mid - late 80's, STD bus data acquisition systems were commonplace using Z80 or similar processor cards for the data capture, processing and control, parallel I/O cards for experiment control as well as analogue to digital conversion cards for reading experiment analogue parameters. Such systems would only occupy minimal rack space, while providing full CP/M processing features.

STD-32
The STD-32 is a pin compatible STD interface that allows the co-existence of both 8-bit and 32-bit systems on a single bus. This is accomplished by the addition of pins between the normal pins that do not connect, nor do they interfere with the original specification. This allows with the proper STD-32 backplane the ability to run legacy cards used for specific applications on the same bus without having to upgrade the complete system.

References

Computer buses